Philadelphia Independence was an American soccer club founded in 2009, after being awarded the eighth Women's Professional Soccer (WPS) franchise. The Independence played only two full seasons of competitive soccer in 2010 season and 2011 season, when the league ultimately folded in 2012.

Statistics
All rostered players during WPS season or post season are included even if they did not make an appearance. Amateur call-ups are only included if they made an appearance. All statistics have been referenced from Soccerway.com, WomensProSoccer.com, and other box scores.

League Statistics

Field Players
All statistics include only WPS regular season matches, and are correct .

Goalkeepers
All statistics include only WPS regular season matches, and are correct .

WPS Playoffs

Field Players
All statistics include only WPS post-season matches, and are correct .

Goalkeeper
All statistics include only WPS post-season matches, and are correct .

References

Lists of soccer players by club in the United States
Players
Lists of women's association football players
Lists of American sportswomen
Philadelphia Independence players
Association football clubs established in 2009
Women's Professional Soccer teams
Association football player non-biographical articles
Philadelphia-related lists
Pennsylvania sports-related lists